Besmir Banushi (born 24 July 1988) is an Albanian cyclist, who last rode for UCI Continental team .

Major results
Source: 

2006
 1st Trofej Sajamskih Gradova
 2nd Overall Tour of Albania
 3rd  Road race, Balkan Junior Road Championships
2007
 2nd Overall Tour of Albania
1st Stage 1
2008
 1st  Road race, Balkan Road Championships
 National Road Championships
2nd Road race
3rd Time trial
 2nd Overall Tour of Albania
 4th Overall Tour of Szeklerland
 5th Plovdiv Cup
 6th Overall Romanian Cycling Tour
2009
 2nd Overall Tour of Albania
2010
 1st  Overall Tour of Albania
1st Stage 5
 3rd Road race, National Road Championships
 3rd Overall Tour of Kosovo
 5th Overall Tour of Trakya
2011
 1st  Overall Tour of Albania
1st Stages 1 & 4
 2nd Road race, National Road Championships
2012
 1st  Overall Tour of Albania
1st Stage 3
 1st  Overall Tour of Kosovo
1st Stages 3 & 4
 3rd Road race, National Road Championships
2015
 National Road Championships
2nd Time trial
3rd Road race
 3rd Overall Tour of Kosovo
 3rd Overall Tour of Albania
1st Prologue
2016
 2nd Overall Tour of Albania
1st Stage 2
2017
 National Road Championships
2nd Time trial
3rd Road race
 2nd Overall Tour of Kosovo
1st Stage 4
2018
 3rd Time trial, National Road Championships
2019
 4th Time trial, National Road Championships
2020
 National Road Championships
3rd Road race
3rd Time trial

References

1988 births
Living people
Sportspeople from Vlorë
Albanian male cyclists